Wuhe Township is a township under the administration of Jianyang, Sichuan, China. , it has 13 villages under its administration.

References 

Township-level divisions of Sichuan
Jianyang, Sichuan